Doverel is an unincorporated community in Terrell County, in the U.S. state of Georgia.

History
The post office in this community closed in 1902. Variant names were "Herodtown", "Dover", and "Doverell".

References

Unincorporated communities in Terrell County, Georgia
Unincorporated communities in Georgia (U.S. state)